Lake Lucinda is a lake in the U.S. state of Washington. It is impounded by the Lake Lucinda Dam.

Lake Lucinda took its name from a nearby residential complex.

References

Lakes of Thurston County, Washington